Fantasy Empire is the sixth studio album by American noise rock band Lightning Bolt. It was released in March 2015 under Thrill Jockey Records.

Track listing

References

External links
 Fantasy Empire at Thrill Jockey Records

2015 albums
Thrill Jockey albums
Lightning Bolt (band) albums